Soufian Echaraf (born 19 May 1994) is a Dutch-Moroccan footballer who plays as a midfielder for IR Tanger.

Club career
He formerly played for De Graafschap, but didn't make the grade and joined amateur side Hercules in summer 2016.

References

External links
 Voetbal International profile 

1994 births
Living people
Footballers from Utrecht (city)
Dutch sportspeople of Moroccan descent
Association football midfielders
Dutch footballers
USV Elinkwijk players
De Graafschap players
Eerste Divisie players